Sharlotte Lucas (born 25 July 1991) is a New Zealand professional road racing cyclist, who currently rides for UCI Women's Continental Team .

Based in Hokitika, New Zealand, Lucas took up competitive cycling in 2010 after taking a break from football. Since then Lucas has quickly added an impressive list of results, alongside of showing her ability to work as a domestique for her teammates. Lucas is a three times winner of the Calder Stewart Elite Teams Series and the current course record holder and three times race winner of Le Race in New Zealand.

Major results

2013
 1st Le Race
2015
 1st Le Race
 National Road Championships
2nd Road race
4th Time trial
2016
 National Road Championships
3rd Time trial
7th Road race
 9th Overall Mersey Valley Tour
2017
 1st Stan Siejka Launceston Cycling Classic
 1st Taupo Cycle Challenge Criterium
 1st Le Race
 1st Nelson Bays Motor Group Nelson Classic
 Calder Stewart Road Race Series
1st Timaru
1st Hokitika Classic
1st Hell of the South
2nd Gore Bay
3rd Dunedin
 1st Ride the Rakaia
 1st Leeston Classic
 2nd Taupo Cycle Challenge
 3rd Overall Amy's Otway Tour
 3rd Oklahoma Pro AM Classic
 Oceania Road Championships
4th Time trial
8th Road race
 National Road Championships
4th Road race
4th Time trial
 Tour of America's Dairyland
4th Kenosha
6th Schlitz Park
9th West Bend
10th Port Washington
 5th Overall Tour of the King Valley
 5th Shimano Sprint Series White Bay Criterium
 7th Overall Mersey Valley Tour
 8th Tulsa Tough Blue Dome Criterium
2018
 Oceania Road Championships
1st  Road race
3rd  Time trial
 National Road Championships
2nd Road race
5th Time trial
 2nd Overall Tour of America's Dairyland
 4th Road race, Commonwealth Games
 7th Cadel Evans Great Ocean Road Race
2019
 Oceania Road Championships
1st  Road race
4th Time trial
 6th Road race, National Road Championships

References

External links

1991 births
New Zealand female cyclists
Living people
Cyclists at the 2018 Commonwealth Games
Commonwealth Games competitors for New Zealand
21st-century New Zealand women